Son is a 1955 Soviet drama film directed by Yuri Ozerov.

Plot 
Senior pupil Andrei Goryaev is facing criminal liability for criminal misconduct. A compassionate witness regrets a young man, and he is released. Having quarreled with his father, Goriaev leaves the house and wanders around the capital until he accidentally finds himself in a new district of Moscow: at the construction site in Cheryomushki.

Cast

 Leonid Kharitonov as Andrey Goryaev
 Pyotr Konstantinov as Goryaev's father
 Varvara Kargashova as Goryaev's mother
 Viktor Geraskin as Vasya Kozlov
 Nadezhda Rumyantseva as Tamara
 Konstantin Sorokin as Panechkin
 Alexey Gribov as Kondratiev
 Vladimir Belokurov as Lavrov
 Roza Makagonova as Shura
 Aleksandr Mikhaylov as Volodya
 Klyon Protasov as policeman
 Pavel Vinnik	as Shibykin
 Ada Vojtsik	as Vasya's mother
 Nina Doroshina as saleswoman
 Vladimir Zemlyanikin as  Starostin
 Yuri Belov as escort policeman
 Konstantin Bartashevich as  school director

Release
Yuri Ozerov's film in the Soviet box office was watched by 28.3 million viewers, which is the 450th result for the whole history of the hire in the USSR.

References

External links 
 

1955 films
Soviet drama films
1950s Russian-language films
Soviet black-and-white films
1955 drama films
Mosfilm films
Films directed by Yuri Ozerov
Soviet teen films